Leonard Paul "Len" Lilyholm (born April 1, 1941) is an American retired professional ice hockey player who played 77 regular season games in the World Hockey Association for the Minnesota Fighting Saints in 1972 and 1973.

Early life 
Lilyholm was born in Robbinsdale, Minnesota. Lilyholm graduated from the University of Minnesota in 1966 and played on the Minnesota Golden Gophers men's ice hockey team. As an amateur, he frequently played for the United States men's national ice hockey team.

Career 
Lilyholm was a member of Team USA at the 1968 Winter Olympics and the 1966, 1967, 1970, 1971, and 1974 Ice Hockey World Championships.

Outside hockey, Len Lilyholm was an architect and builder who participated in the design of the St. Paul Civic Center, the Saints' new home arena which was completed in January 1973. He appeared as a hockey coach in Ice Castles, a 1978 romantic drama film.

References

External links

The Complete Historical and Statistical Reference to the World Hockey Association by Scott Surgent, Xaler Press, 

1941 births
American men's ice hockey left wingers
Ice hockey people from Minneapolis
Ice hockey players at the 1968 Winter Olympics
Living people
Minnesota Fighting Saints players
Olympic ice hockey players of the United States
Rochester Mustangs players
Suncoast Suns (SHL) players

People from Robbinsdale, Minnesota